Huttenlocher is a surname. Notable people with the surname include:

Britta Huttenlocher (born 1962), Swiss painter
Daniel P. Huttenlocher (born 1959), American computer scientist
Peter Huttenlocher (1931–2013), American neurologist and neuroscientist
Philippe Huttenlocher (born 1942), Swiss opera singer